Mihaela Fileva (born May 15, 1991) is a Bulgarian singer-songwriter and dancer. Her career started in 2005 when she won the Bulgarian National Television show – “Hit Minus One”. Her big breakthrough was in 2011 when she was a finalist in The X factor Bulgaria.

Biography
Fileva was born in Veliko Tarnovo on May 15, 1991. She began playing piano and singing at the age of 6. At 9 she took her first dance classes. She won the music show "Hit-1" in 2006. She studied in The National Academy of Music "Prof. Pancho Vladigerov".

Education 
She graduated from the High School of mathematics and natural sciences "Vasil Drumev" in her hometown Veliko Tarnovo and then studied jazz and pop at The National Academy of Music “Prof. Pancho Vladigerov”, Sofia

Music career
Mihaela has won multiple awards including  "Female singer of the Year" award winner (BG Radio, Box TV, 359 Hip-Hop Music Awards), "Album of the Year" and "Lyrics of the year" (BG Radio), "Woman of The Year" (in Music, Grazia magazine).

Mihaela first made an impression in 2011 as one of the finalists in "X-factor". Her appearance was noticed by the audience and some music producers and soon after she signed with the label Monte Music. In 2012 Mihaela released a single with Billy Hlapeto called "Kogato ti triabvam".

A few months later, the release of Mihaela's single "Opasno blizki", ft. VenZy, made her nationally popular as it turned into a smash hit. It was followed by "A dano, ama nadali" and "Prilivi i otlivi".
Once Mihaela released her debut album "Incognito", it was evidence that she is a productive songwriter and artist. Her singles "Na ryba na ludostta", "Edno naum", "I az sym tuk" and "Incognito" topped the charts in Bulgaria.
The release of her second album „Nova stranitsa" was followed by a sold out concert in one of the biggest concert halls in Sofia and a national tour. The title song, written by Mihaela herself, is considered a masterpiece. In 2020 her third album was released, it was the first live one called “Live in NDK”. 
The latest hit singles "Yin&Yang", "100 na 100"/"All The Way", "Latino Señorita", "Na drugia krai na sveta", "Rodena s kasmet" are included in Mihaela's fourth album "Yin&Yang", released in 2021 and presented with national tour.

In 2015 she wrote Mihaela Marinova's debut single "Стъпка напред".

On April 18, 2019 she gave her first solo concert in Hall 1 of The National Palace of Culture in Sofia.

Albums

Studio albums

Singles

External links
 Official Facebook profile
 MonteMusic

References

1991 births
Living people
People from Veliko Tarnovo
Bulgarian LGBT rights activists
21st-century Bulgarian women singers
X Factor (Bulgarian TV series)
Bulgarian jazz singers
Bulgarian pop singers